Lee Kil-Yong (Korean: 이길용; born September 29, 1959) is a South Korean former footballer who played as a forward.

He started professional career at POSCO Atoms in 1983.
He was squad of South Korea national under-20 football team in 1979 FIFA World Youth Championship.

References

External links 
 
 Lee Kil-yong – National Team Stats at KFA 
 

1959 births
Association football forwards
Pohang Steelers players
K League 1 players
South Korean footballers
Korea University alumni
Living people